Jean MacIntosh Turfa (born 1947 in Philadelphia, Pennsylvania) is an American archaeologist and authority on the Etruscan civilization.

Jean MacIntosh graduated from Abington High School in Philadelphia and then earned her bachelor's degree at Gwynedd Mercy College. She went on to complete a Ph.D. in Classical and Near Eastern Archaeology at Bryn Mawr College in 1974.

Turfa has taught at the University of Liverpool, the University of Illinois at Chicago, the University of Chicago, Loyola University Chicago, Drexel University, Dickinson College, Bryn Mawr College, St. Joseph's University and the University of Pennsylvania.

She has participated in archaeological excavation campaigns in the United States, the United Kingdom, in Italy at Poggio Civitate (Murlo), and at Corinth in Greece. She has been engaged in research and museum-based projects at the Manchester Museum, the Liverpool Museum, the British Museum and the University of Pennsylvania Museum of Archaeology and Anthropology.

She  is a member of the US section of the Istituto Nazionale di Studi Etruschi ed Italici.

Publications

References

External links 
  The Etruscan World

1947 births
Linguists of Etruscan
Bryn Mawr College alumni
Classical archaeologists
Women classical scholars
Living people
Gwynedd Mercy University alumni
University of Illinois Chicago faculty
Loyola University Chicago faculty
Drexel University faculty
Bryn Mawr College faculty
Dickinson College faculty
Academics of the University of Liverpool
Saint Joseph's University faculty
University of Pennsylvania faculty
American archaeologists
American women archaeologists
American classical scholars
American expatriate academics
Expatriate academics in the United Kingdom
American expatriates in the United Kingdom
Writers from Philadelphia
American women academics
21st-century American women